It's Only the End of the World is a 2016 drama film written, edited and directed by Xavier Dolan. The film is based on the 1990 play of the same name by Jean-Luc Lagarce and stars Gaspard Ulliel, Nathalie Baye, Marion Cotillard, Léa Seydoux, and Vincent Cassel. It is about a young playwright who reunites with his family after a 12-year absence to inform them he is going to die.

A co-production of Canada and France, it was shot in Montreal and Laval, Quebec, beginning in 2015. The small core of actors were selected against typecasting, with Ulliel and Cotillard challenged by the awkwardness in dialogue inherent in Lagarce's work.

The film made its world premiere at the 2016 Cannes Film Festival, where it competed for the Palme d'Or and received mixed reactions from critics. The film won the Cannes Grand Prix - making Dolan the second Canadian director to receive this award, and the Ecumenical Jury Prize at Cannes. It also won six Canadian Screen Awards, including Best Motion Picture, and three César Awards: Best Director, Best Actor and Best Editing.

Plot
In a place identified only as "Somewhere," Louis, a 34-year-old gay playwright dealing with a terminal illness, takes a short flight to his home to reunite with his family, whom he has not seen in 12 years. His younger sister, Suzanne, has little memory of him. Upon arriving at the house, Louis' mother Martine is surprised to realize Louis has never met his brother Antoine's wife Catherine, as Louis was not present at their wedding. Catherine begins telling Louis about her and Antoine's children, nervously stammering to explain why they named one of their boys Louis, after Louis and Antoine's father. Antoine creates tension, snapping that Louis is uninterested in hearing about their children. Louis talks on the telephone to someone, saying he plans to tell his family about his impending death and then leave, while expressing uncertainty as to how they will react.

Louis and Catherine awkwardly meet in the hallway and attempt to apologize to each other for the tense conversations. Louis remarks he assumes Antoine has attempted to give her a negative opinion of Louis. Catherine replies Antoine actually speaks little of Louis, and Antoine feels Louis has little to no interest in their lives, and she openly suspects this belief may have some truth in it. She questions Louis if he knows what Antoine does for a living, explaining he makes tools in a nearby location. Martine also lectures Louis about taking responsibility in the family, saying his status, success and courage gives him some authority. She learns that he has moved from the address where she had been sending his mail, and he had not told her where he currently lives.

Louis expresses interest in seeing the family's former house, citing nostalgia, which bewilders the others who regard it as a ruin. The family argument that follows, puts an end to his wish. He rides with Antoine to the shops for cigarettes and makes small talk which angers Antoine who is sick of all the secrecy surrounding Louis's life and the reason as to why he's returned. He later tells Louis that his former lover Pierre died about a week ago from cancer.

During a meal, Louis promises to visit home more, and tells Suzanne she is welcome to visit him. However, it soon becomes apparent Louis intends to leave. Seizing upon this, Antoine tries to remove him from the house insisting on driving him to the airport, while the family shouts back at Antoine for his brutality. Antoine lashes back, saying he is tired of being treated as the family's freak. After a pause, Louis leaves without having told his family of his prognosis.

Production

Development
Canadian director Xavier Dolan said that when he originally read Jean-Luc Lagarce's play Juste la fin du monde, he felt "lost," citing its style and the aggressive nature of the characters. He later re-read it, saying "One day, I don't know what it was, I pulled it off my shelf and suddenly understood and appreciated this weird and verbose writing style".

Dolan described the extensive work required to adapt the stage play for film:  Dolan denied the film was semi-autobiographical, asserting "I’m not dying. I’m not misunderstood by my family". Star Nathalie Baye said Dolan wrote not only the French dialogue but the English subtitles.

Plans for Dolan to direct a film titled Juste la fin du monde, with Ulliel, Baye, Cotillard, Léa Seydoux and Vincent Cassel starring, were announced in April 2015. Through support from Telefilm Canada, the film was produced by Sons of Manual's Nancy Grant and Dolan and MK2 Productions's Nathanaël Karmitz along with Sylvain Corbeil. Seville International handled the international sales of the film.

Casting

In casting the film, Dolan claimed he did not contemplate personally playing Louis, citing the older age of French actor Gaspard Ulliel as possibly giving Louis more dimensions. Ulliel was interested in working with Dolan and attempted to meet with him several times to discuss making a film together. Other choices for actors defied typecasting, as Marion Cotillard was selected to play a shy character.

Baye took the role of Martine, citing Dolan's typical portrayal of mother figures in his films, which she regarded as remarkable. Baye had previously collaborated with Dolan on his 2012 film Laurence Anyways.

Filming
Principal photography began on 26 May 2015 in Montreal. Scenes were shot in Laval, Quebec, where a set was established in a small and inconspicuous house in the suburbs. Dolan explained that he believed the story is set in Europe, but gave it a small Canadian veneer. In the bungalow, the crew set up in the basement, with Mexican director Guillermo del Toro inspecting the equipment. Cassel reported sets and lighting were prepared one year before the cast arrived for filming.

Seydoux described her experience working with Dolan as a loving one, saying "It is always a romance. I was very excited when I met Xavier for the first time. For me, he is a real artist. I can say, I am kind of fascinated". Cotillard described her part as challenging, citing her character's "flood of incoherences", made up of "mostly aborted sentences and redundancies. At first I was terrified by my text and then I understood that her monologues were like the sound of silence". Baye was initially taken aback by the heavy makeup applied to her for her character, and took time to adjust. After only five days of filming, shooting was delayed in August 2015 while Seydoux departed to work on the film Spectre.

In selecting his soundtrack, Dolan sought "this sort of happy, sad, nostalgia-filled texture". Hence, he chose "I Miss You" by Blink-182 and "Natural Blues" by Moby. The film was dedicated to the deceased Canadian costume designer François Barbeau.

Release

Plans for Diaphana/MK2 to release the film in France, while Entertainment One and Les Films Seville would distribute the film in Canada, were announced in April 2015. The first image from the film, featuring Cotillard, was released on 13 June 2015. The film had its world premiere at the Cannes Film Festival on 19 May 2016.

It was featured in competition at the Sydney Film Festival in June 2016. The film was also screened at the 2016 Toronto International Film Festival. The film was released in Quebec and France on 21 September 2016, with its Toronto release following on 23 September. In 2017, the film was in competition for the Grand Jury Prize at Italy's Riviera International Film Festival.

In Canada, it was released on DVD and Blu-ray on 7 February 2017. It was released in the United States on 30 June 2017, by Netflix.

Reception
Critical response

The film premiered to polarized reactions from festival audiences and critics, with Vanity Fair calling it "the most disappointing film at Cannes". The Hollywood Reporter called it "a cold and deeply unsatisfying" film and Variety dubbed it "a frequently excruciating dramatic experience". Despite this, the film received positive reviews from critics, including The Guardian calling it a "brilliant, stylised and hallucinatory evocation of family dysfunction". Peter Howell of the Toronto Star wrote the film "deserves more applause than boos" and commended Dolan on his calm response to negative reviews. Cassel also argued the melodrama that some critics derided was appropriate to convey the family's collapse.

In Canada,  of La Presse gave the film three and a half stars, commending Gaspard Ulliel for giving one of his best performances and cinematographer André Turpin for superb visuals. T'cha Dunlevy of the Montreal Gazette awarded it four stars, praising Turpin and "Dolan's daring cinematic approach to the subject matter", noting the number of close-ups. On 7 December 2016, the film was named to the Toronto International Film Festival's annual Canada's Top 10 list. In France, Isabelle Regnier wrote in Le Monde that the film far exceeded low expectations, and was one of Dolan's strongest works. Thierry Chèze of L'Express found the ambition admirable, and the film's contrasts to mirror Dolan's. Téléramas Louis Guichard wrote Dolan kept his style with his first all-French cast and a darker story.

AlloCiné, a French cinema website, gave the film an average of 3.2/5, based on a survey of 44 French reviews. The site's critical consensus reads, "It's Only the End of the World is stocked with talent and boasts a story steeped in conflict, but the end result proves a disappointing misfire from writer-director Xavier Dolan." At Metacritic, which assigns a rating out of 100 to reviews from mainstream critics, the film received a score of 48, based on 11 reviews, indicating "mixed or average reviews".

Box office
In France, It's Only the End of the World was released to 391 screens, where it debuted at number one at the box office and sold 1,034,477 tickets. The only three prior Quebec films to surpass one million admissions in France were The Decline of the American Empire (1986), The Barbarian Invasions (2003) and Dolan's 2014 film Mommy. In Quebec, the film grossed $445,132 by 3 October 2016, a respectable performance in Quebec cinema, though not as strong as Mommy.

By 31 October, Les Films Séville reported the film grossed $747,386 in Quebec. By 12 February 2017, Box Office Mojo reported a worldwide gross of $9 million.

Accolades

The film was selected to compete for the Palme d'Or at the 2016 Cannes Film Festival where it won the Grand Prix and the Ecumenical Jury Prize. It became the second Canadian film to win the Grand Prix, after Atom Egoyan's The Sweet Hereafter, and Dolan became the first Quebec filmmaker to win the Grand Prix. The announcement of the awards drew boos from the press, with Dolan emotionally quoting French poet Anatole France in saying, "I prefer the madness of passion to the wisdom of indifference". Canadian Prime Minister Justin Trudeau congratulated Dolan on Twitter, writing "You’ve made us proud again, Xavier".It's Only the End of the World was selected as the Canadian entry for the Best Foreign Language Film at the 89th Academy Awards. In December 2016, it made the shortlist of nine films to be considered for a nomination, though it was not ultimately nominated. The film received nine nominations for the Canadian Screen Awards and six nominations for France's César Awards. At the César Awards, the three wins tied with Divines for the most honours of the night. It's Only the End of the World'' was also the major film winner at the Canadian Screen Awards, where producer Sylvain Corbeil read statements by Dolan, who was unable to attend while working on a film in Paris.

See also
 List of submissions to the 89th Academy Awards for Best Foreign Language Film
 List of Canadian submissions for the Academy Award for Best Foreign Language Film

References

External links 
 
  (rating 2.5/5)

2016 LGBT-related films
2016 films
Best Picture Genie and Canadian Screen Award winners
Canadian drama films
Canadian independent films
Canadian LGBT-related films
Entertainment One films
Films about dysfunctional families
Films about writers
French films based on plays
Films directed by Xavier Dolan
Films shot in Montreal
Films scored by Gabriel Yared
French drama films
French independent films
French LGBT-related films
Films whose director won the Best Director César Award
Films featuring a Best Actor César Award-winning performance
Gay-related films
2016 drama films
2016 independent films
Cannes Grand Prix winners
Best Film Prix Iris winners
French-language Canadian films
2010s Canadian films
2010s French films